Franck Ange Khalfoun (born 9 March 1968) is a French film director and screenwriter, known for directing P2, Wrong Turn at Tahoe, Maniac, and the Amityville franchise entry Amityville: The Awakening. His latest film was the 2019 horror film Prey. His upcoming film is the action-thriller film Entry Level.

Filmography

Feature films

Other works

References

External links 
 

French film directors
French male screenwriters
French screenwriters
1968 births
Living people
Horror film directors